Trans Caribbean can refer to:
 Trans Caribbean Airways
Trans-Caribbean pipeline